Myrtle Avenue was a train station along the Evergreen Branch of the Long Island Rail Road. The station opened on May 16, 1878, at Myrtle Avenue and Gates Avenue. From the Greenpoint Terminal it took 18 minutes to get here and Myrtle Avenue was 3.26 miles away from Greenpoint Terminal. The station was located under the present-day Myrtle Avenue El. The station closed with the end of passenger service in May 1882.

References

External links
EVERGREEN BRANCH: another lost LIRR line (Forgotten New York)
Arrts Archives THE L.I.R.R.'S EVERGREEN BRANCH

Former Long Island Rail Road stations in New York City
Railway stations closed in 1882
Railway stations in the United States opened in 1878
Railway stations in Brooklyn
1878 establishments in New York (state)
1882 disestablishments in New York (state)
Bushwick, Brooklyn